The 1945 Kansas Jayhawks football team represented the University of Kansas in the Big Six Conference during the 1945 college football season. In their third and final season under head coach Henry Shenk, the Jayhawks compiled a 4–5–1 record (1–3–1 against conference opponents), finished fifth in the conference, and were outscored by opponents by a combined total of 175 to 139. They played their home games at Memorial Stadium in Lawrence, Kansas.

The team's statistical leaders included Dick Bertuzzi with 360 rushing yards, George Gear with 223 passing yards, Norm Pumphrey with 212 receiving yards, and Leroy Robison with 46 points scored (six touchdowns and ten extra points). Dave Schmidt was the team captain.

Schedule

References

Kansas
Kansas Jayhawks football seasons
Kansas Jayhawks football